The Nasher (or Nashir) (Dari: الناشر, Persian: الناشر) are a noble Afghan family and Khans of the Pashtun Kharoti (Ghilji) tribe. The family is originally from Qarabagh, Ghazni but founded modern day Kunduz in the early 20th century and lived there until the end of the Barakzai dynasty in the late 20th century. Members of the family now live in the United States, in the United Kingdom, Canada, Denmark and in Germany.

Origins and history

The Nasher are often linked to the ancient Ghaznavid dynasty. The Ghaznavids were a Turko-Persian dynasty of Mamluk origin who carved out an empire, at their greatest extent ruling large parts of Persia, much of Transoxania, and the northern parts of the Indian subcontinent from 977 to 1186 A.D. When the Ghaznavid dynasty was defeated in 1148 by the Ghurids, the Ghaznavid Sultans continued to live in Ghazni. They became known as the House of Nasher. 

The next mention of the Nasher was in 1120 A.H (1709 A.D.), when Ghilji Pashtun tribesmen under Khan Nasher successfully overthrew Safavid rule to establish the Ghilji Hotaki dynasty, which controlled Afghanistan from 1719 to 1729 A.D. and much of Persia from 1722-1729 until Nadir Shah of Persia seized power in the Battle of Damghan.

The Nasher (often referred to as Ghaznavid)  then lived as Khans of the Kharoti (Pashto: خروټی), a Pashtun tribe of Ghilji origin with an estimated population of about 5.5 million, making it one of the largest, if not the largest tribe in Afghanistan, with significant territory throughout eastern and south-eastern Afghanistan: Ghazni, Zabul, Paktia, Khost, Logar, Wardak, Kabul and Nangarhar.

In the 19th century

After the great Ghilji rebellion in 1885–1886, led by Alam Khan Nasher, the Nasher family was exiled by the ruling Barakzai King Amir Abdur Rahman Khan in order to weaken his nemesis.
Sher Khan Nasher, Khan of the Kharoti soon became governor of the Kunduz district launched an industrialisation campaign, founding the Spinzar Company, with major urban development and construction programmes.
Economic development transformed Kunduz into a thriving city with new residential housing, schools, and hospitals for the factory workers. Sher Khan Nasher also implemented Qizel Qala harbour that was later named Sher Khan Bandar in his honour. As his power grew and he eventually controlled the whole north of Afghanistan, the throne was within his reach, which is why there are theories that he was poisoned by the Barakzai king.
Several schools were named after him, with many high-profile graduates, such as Hekmatyar, Farhad Darya Nasher, Dr. Saddrudin Sahar and Suleman Kakar Muhammad Nasher Khan was the governor of Badakshan in the 1930s.

In modern history
Sher Khan's nephew and stepson Ghulam Sarwar Nasher developed Spinzar further, employing over 20,000 people and maintaining construction companies, a porcelain factory and hotels in Kunduz and throughout Afghanistan.
Long before he became a radical, Nashir sent fellow Kharoti Hekmatyar to Kabul's Mahtab Qala military academy in 1968, as he considered him to be a promising young man. After he was expelled from the Mahtab Qala, Nasher imprisoned him briefly for toying with Communist ideology,

Discovery of Alexandria on the Oxus 
On a hunting trip, Nashir discovered ancient artifacts of Ai Khanom and invited Princeton-archaeologist Daniel Schlumberger with his team to examine Ai-Khanoum.  It was soon found to be the historical Alexandria on the Oxus, also possibly later named اروکرتیه or Eucratidia), one of the primary cities of the Greco-Bactrian kingdom.  Some of those artifects were displayed in Europe and USA museums in 2004.

Nashir was awarded "The Order of the Sacred Treasure" by the Emperor of Japan, in 1971, among other awards.
The current governor of the Kunduz district is Nizamuddin Nasher Khan, considered to be the "last scion of a legendary Afghan dynasty" still living in Kunduz, as members of the family are now mostly living in England, Germany, and the United States.

Notable Nasher
The most populer Afghan singer, Farhad Darya Nasher, is a grandson of Sher Khan.

Sher Khan Nasher Loe Khan (Grand Khan) founder of Spinzar Cotton Company and founding father of Kunduz
Gholam Serwar Nasher Khan (1922–1984), president of Spinzar Cotton Company
Gholam Nabi Nasher Khan (1926–2010), parliamentarian
Gholam Rabani Nasher Khan (1940–), member of the Loya Jirga
Farhad Darya Nasher Khan (1962–), singer and composer
Jack Nasher Khan (1979-), business psychologist

Cities and places named after the Nasher
Sher Khan Bandar, largest port of Afghanistan
Qal`eh-ye Nasher
Sher Khan High School, Kunduz
Sher Khan Dry Port School, Northern Kunduz province
Nasher Museum, Kunduz

References

Further reading
Dupree, Louis: Afghanistan
Emadi, Hafizullah: Dynamics of Political Development in Afghanistan. The British, Russian, and American Invasions
Meher, Jagmohan: Afghanistan: Dynamics of Survival
Runion, Meredith L.: The History of Afghanistan
Tanwir, Halim M.: AFGHANISTAN: History, Diplomacy and Journalism
An Introduction to the Commercial Law of Afghanistan, Second Edition, Afghanistan Legal Education Project (ALEP) at Stanford Law School

Ghilji Pashtun tribes